A penumbral lunar eclipse took place on Sunday, September 6, 1998, the last of three lunar eclipses in 1998.

Visibility

Related eclipses

Eclipses of 1998 
 A total solar eclipse on February 26.
 A penumbral lunar eclipse on March 13.
 A penumbral lunar eclipse on August 8.
 An annular solar eclipse on August 22.
 A penumbral lunar eclipse on September 6.

Lunar year series 
This is the last of four lunar year eclipses at the descending node of the moon's orbit.

Half-Saros cycle
A lunar eclipse will be preceded and followed by solar eclipses by 9 years and 5.5 days (a half saros). This lunar eclipse is related to two partial solar eclipses of Solar Saros 154.

See also
List of lunar eclipses
List of 20th-century lunar eclipses

References

External links
 Saros cycle 147
 

1998-09
1998 in science
September 1998 events